Oru Murai Vanthu Parthaya may refer to:
"Oru Murai Vanthu Parthaya", a song from the 1993 Malayalam film Manichithrathazhu
Oru Murai Vanthu Parthaya (film), a 2016 Malayalam film starring Unni Mukundan